Gerald Ryan Ottenheimer  (June 4, 1934January 18, 1998) was a Canadian politician and Senator.

Ottenheimer, was the scion of one of Newfoundland's wealthiest family. His grandfather was prosperous fishing magnate James M. Ryan. He was born London, England, the son of Frederick and Marguerite (Ryan) Ottenheimer, he was educated at the University of Rome, University of Paris, University of Cambridge, Memorial University of Newfoundland, and Fordham University.

Ottenheimer ran unsuccessfully as a Progressive Conservative in the 1965 federal election in the Newfoundland and Labrador riding of St. John's West.

In 1966, he was  elected to the Newfoundland and Labrador House of Assembly as one of three Progressive Conservative Party of Newfoundland and Labrador during the Joey Smallwood electoral sweep. During his 16 years as an MHA, he was party leader, Leader of the Opposition from 1967 to 1969, served in the cabinets of Premiers Frank Moores and Brian Peckford, and was Speaker of the Newfoundland and Labrador House of Assembly.

In 1987, he was appointed to the Senate by Brian Mulroney representing the senatorial division of Waterford-Trinity, Newfoundland and Labrador. From 1992 to 1998, he was the Speaker pro tempore. He died of cancer while in office in 1998.

He was married to Alma and had four daughters, Geraldine, Suzanne, Bernadette and Ann Marie. His half-brother is former MHA John Ottenheimer and he was the father-in-law of former Progressive Conservative Party leader Ed Byrne.

See also

External links
 

1934 births
1998 deaths
Canadian senators from Newfoundland and Labrador
Progressive Conservative Party of Canada senators
Progressive Conservative Party of Newfoundland and Labrador MHAs
Newfoundland and Labrador political party leaders
Newfoundland and Labrador candidates for Member of Parliament
Candidates in the 1965 Canadian federal election
Progressive Conservative Party of Canada candidates for the Canadian House of Commons
Lawyers in Newfoundland and Labrador
20th-century Canadian lawyers